Janica is a Slavic female given name, generally used in Croatia, the diminutive form of the name Jana. The English equivalent of the name is Janice or Janie.

People
Notable women named Janica:
 Janica Kostelić, Croatian female alpine skier

Fictional characters
The female protagonist of Slavko Kolar's Breza, and Ante Babaja's movie Breza, is called Janica.

Other
JAniCA initialism for Japanese Animation Creators Association.

See also
 
 Janika

Feminine given names
Croatian feminine given names
Czech feminine given names